For the Alberta politician, see: Henry William McKenney.

Henry McKenney ( – 1886) was a merchant from Amherstburg, Upper Canada.

McKenney was a merchant in Amherstburg until that business became financially troubled. He, his wife and one son came west to Upper Fort Garry arriving in June 1859. He started the first hotel in what would shortly become Manitoba.

McKenney originally purchased the land upon which Portage and Main sits on 2 June 1862. He chose land where the north–south and east–west ox cart paths crossed, in order to build a general store with his half-brother John Christian Schultz.

References

External links
 MHS Transactions - The Man Who Created the Corner of Portage and Main

1826 births
1886 deaths
Canadian merchants
People from Amherstburg, Ontario